The Hurstville City Council was a local government area in the St George and southern region of Sydney, New South Wales, Australia. Hurstville was incorporated as a municipality in 1887, declared a city in 1988, and abolished in 2016, forming with Kogarah City Council the new Georges River Council.

Council history
On 25 March 1887 the NSW Government Gazette published a proclamation declaring the "Municipal District of Hurstville". On 29 December 1887, the Municipality was divided into three wards: Bexley Ward, Hurstville Ward and Peakhurst Ward. On 28 June 1900, a further proclamation declared the separation of Bexley Ward as the Borough of Bexley. 

A proclamation on the same day reconstituted Hurstville, divided into two wards: Hurstville and Peakhurst. On 10 September 1908, Hurstville was divided into four wards: Hurstville Ward, Woodville Ward, Peakhurst Ward and Penshurst Ward. On 2 August 1922, a part of Hurstville was transferred to the Sutherland Shire; on 5 December 1924 part of Canterbury Municipality was transferred to Hurstville; and on 1 January 1931 part of Hurstville was transferred to Kogarah Municipality. On 3 July 1968 Woodville Ward was abolished, with the council divided into three wards: Hurstville, Peakhurst and Penshurst.

In December 1920, Hurstville combined with the councils of Rockdale, Kogarah, and Bexley to form the St George County Council. The elected County Council was established to provide electricity to the Kogarah, Rockdale, Hurstville, and Bexley areas and ceased to exist when it was amalgamated with the Sydney County Council on 1 January 1980. On 25 November 1988 the Municipality of Hurstville was proclaimed as the "City of Hurstville".

Council seats
In 1889 Hurstville Council purchased a property on the corner of Forest Road, Hurstville, for £1750, as the first Council Chambers until 1913. However, its small size meant that within a few decades, Council sought options for a new purpose-built Council Chambers further up on a site fronting McMahon Street on the corner with Dora Street occupied by the fire station. By November 1913 the old fire station was remodelled into new Council Chambers by architect (and former Mayor of Kogarah) Charles Herbert Halstead.

On 31 July 1930 Council approved a proposal for new chambers on the site of the 1913 chambers. The foundation stone, placed next to the re-laid foundation stone from the demolished 1913 chambers, was laid by Mayor Hill on 6 December 1930. The new Chambers, designed in the Inter-War Georgian Revival style by architects Herbert & Wilson (Leonard Federick Herbert and Edward Douglas Wilson), was officially opened on 16 May 1931 by the Minister for Local Government, William McKell.

A new 'Civic Centre' concept with the provision of a performance hall, for a site on McMahon Street north of Dora Street was first proposed Mayor Olds on 17 July 1947, and was the subject of continuing debate throughout the 1950s. The project was finally approved by Council in June 1954. Designed in the Post-War International Style by architects Peddle Thorp & Walker and built by James S. Samson & Co. of Parramatta, the new Civic Centre included an auditorium which seated 1264 people (named Marana Hall in 1964, meaning 'place of stars') and a smaller hall (named Amaroo Hall in 1964, meaning 'lovely place'). Completed at a cost of £320,000, the Civic Centre was officially opened on 2 June 1962 by the Governor of New South Wales, Sir Eric Woodward.

After the completion of the Civic Centre in 1962, the former Council Chambers further down on McMahon Street was tenanted by the Bank of New South Wales from 1963 to 1965 and the St George Police-Citizens Boys' Club from 1966 to 1969, before being demolished in January 1974 for the 'Hurstville House' office/retail development. The foundation stones from the old Council Chambers were incorporated into façade of 1962 Civic Centre.

In January 1977, Hurstville Council acquired the former 'Rivoli Hall' on the other corner of Dora Street and McMahon Street, which was soon demolished to make way for a Brutalist style extension to the Civic Centre that would incorporate a new central library designed by the Council Architect. The extension and library, completed at a cost of approximately $4.3 million, was officially opened on 30 July 1982 by the Premier of New South Wales, Neville Wran.

Amalgamation proposals
Efforts to bring about a unified council for the St George area were raised regularly since 1901 and the 1946 Clancy Royal Commission into local government boundaries recommended the amalgamation of the municipalities of Hurstville, Kogarah, Rockdale and Bexley. In the following act of parliament passed in December 1948, the Local Government (Areas) Act 1948, the recommendations of the commission were modified, leading only to the merger of Bexley and Rockdale councils. A merger was again considered in the 1970s, but 1977 plebiscites run in Hurstville and Kogarah rejected the idea. A further idea of amalgamating Kogarah and Hurstville with Sutherland Shire to the south was raised in 1999 but did not progress.

On 12 May 2016 the NSW Government announced that Hurstville and Kogarah would merge to form the Georges River Council, with immediate effect.

Suburbs and localities in the former local government area 
Suburbs in the Hurstville City Council area were:

The following unofficial localities were also located within Hurstville:

Demographics 
At the 2011 Census, there were  people in the Hurstville local government area, of these 48.5% were male and 51.5% were female. Aboriginal and Torres Strait Islander people made up 0.6% of the population. The median age of people in the City was 37 years. Children aged 0 – 14 years made up 17.7% of the population and people aged 65 years and over made up 15.4% of the population. Of people in the area aged 15 years and over, 53.4% were married and 9.2% were either divorced or separated.

Population growth in Hurstville City Council between the 2001 Census and the 2006 Census was 5.31%; and in the subsequent five years to the 2011 Census, population growth was 6.96%. When compared with total population growth of Australia for the same periods, being 5.78% and 8.32% respectively, population growth in Hurstville local government area was marginally lower than the national average. The median weekly income for residents within the City was generally on par with the national average.

Council

Final composition and election method
Hurstville City Council was composed of twelve Councillors elected proportionally as three separate wards, each ward electing four Councillors. All Councillors were elected for a fixed four-year term of office. The Mayor and Deputy Mayor were elected annually by the Councillors at the first meeting of the Council in September. The last election was held on 8 September 2012, and the final makeup of the Council in the term 2012–2016, in order of election by ward, was as follows:

Mayors

Coat of arms
Hurstville City Council adopted the current coat of arms as part of the Council’s centenary celebrations in 1987 and was designed by H. Ellis Tomlinson of the College of Arms.

References

External links 
Hurstville City Council website (Archived)

1887 establishments in Australia
Former local government areas in Sydney
Lists of local government leaders of places in New South Wales
 
Georges River Council
2016 disestablishments in Australia